Tomosvaryella is a genus of big-headed flies (insects in the family Pipunculidae).

See also
 List of Tomosvaryella species

References

Pipunculidae
Brachycera genera
Diptera of Europe
Diptera of Asia
Diptera of North America